The Sybils, or Sybils receiving instruction from Angels, is a painting by the Italian renaissance artist Raphael. It was painted in 1514, as part of a commission Raphael had received from the Sienese banker Agostino Chigi to decorate the interior of Santa Maria della Pace in Rome.

The painting shows four sibyls - Cumaean, Persian, Phrygian and Tiburtine, accompanied by attendant angels. Art historian Michael Hirst notes there is a "striking" parallel between the figures of the Sybils and the practice sketches of Michelangelo.

See also
List of paintings by Raphael

Notes

References

External links

1514 paintings
Paintings by Raphael
Angels in art
Sibyls
Nude art

Paintings of sibyls